The National Center for Toxicological Research (NCTR) is a branch of the U.S. Food & Drug Administration (FDA) located in Jefferson, Arkansas. Established in 1971, the Center conducts scientific research to provide reliable data for Food & Drug Administration decision-making and develops innovative tools and approaches that support its public health mission.

History

The National Center for Toxicological Research is geographically adjacent to the Pine Bluff Arsenal, and was once an integrated part of the installation. It was established by executive order on January 27, 1971. The U.S. Army Chemical Corps used the facility for biological warfare research and chemical weapons development until 1969, when President Richard Nixon signed an executive order banning such research from military facilities, and the Army subsequently transferred operation of the site to the FDA.

Headquarters
The Center is located off Interstate 530 at Jefferson, Arkansas. It is the only FDA center located outside the Washington, D.C. metropolitan area, and its campus takes up approximately 1 million square feet.

References

External links

 
 

1971 establishments in Arkansas
Food and Drug Administration
Former military buildings and structures
Government agencies established in 1971
Laboratories in the United States
Military history of Arkansas
Organizations based in Arkansas
Toxicology organizations